King Tears Bat Trip is the eponymously titled debut studio album of King Tears Bat Trip, released on March 24, 2012 by Table & Chairs Records. Influenced by Haitian Voodoo rhythms and the avant-garde jazz of Albert Ayler, the album was critically well-received and made the band a favorite of the Northwest's burgeoning DIY scene. It was remastered by Scott Colburn re-issued on vinyl by Debacle Records on June 10, 2014.

Track listing

Personnel
Adapted from the King Tears Bat Trip liner notes.

King Tears Bat Trip
 Luke Bergman – electric guitar, percussion, mixing
 Thomas Campbell – drums
 Kristian Garrard – drums
 Chris Icasiano – drums
 Brandon Lucia – electronics, percussion (2)
 Neil Welch – tenor saxophone, percussion
 Evan Woodle – drums

Production and additional personnel
 Kristian Garrard – mastering, cover art, design

Release history

References

External links 
 King Tears Bat Trip at Bandcamp

2012 debut albums
Instrumental albums